Chainrai Bachomal Dattaramani Sami (1743–1850) was a Sindhi language poet who merged the Vedic wisdom in his Sindhi Shlokas in Beit form.

References

External links
Sami Chain Rai Bachomal

1743 births
1850 deaths
Sindhi-language poets
Sindhi people
People from Shikarpur District